Murder Collection V.1 is a 2009 American horror anthology film written and directed by Fred Vogel, and co-written by Don Moore, Shelby Vogel, and Jerami Cruise.

Plot 
The film's opening explains that in 1994 a web series called Murder, which broadcast footage of actual deaths and acts of violence, appeared. After being active for four months, Murder was shut down by the authorities and had all of its content confiscated, though the website's host, a man known only as Balan, evaded capture. Now, years later, Balan has reemerged to share more clips that he has unearthed, while also offering commentary on people's obsession with death, the effect it has on them, and how accessible new media has made it. The series of videos is kicked off by Balan querying, "I ask you all... Why are you watching? Are you trying to find reality? Do you feel the need to be shocked? To witness something that human eyes shouldn't see? Murder is reality. Death comes when you least expect it. With what you are about to observe, you may question your own integrity. You will ask, could this happen to me? My answer to you is... Yes it can."

 Bludgeoning: A drunk Russian man accidentally beats his teenage son to death in front of the son's webcam.
 The Heist: A restaurant's security system records a robbery committed by four gunmen, who shoot a cashier in the head and a fleeing customer in the back.
 The Cheat: In front of a stationary camera a man, Greg reminisces about how he met his wife, and about all of the good times that they shared, while a monitor in the background shows his wife having sex with someone else. The man leaves the room, and the monitor shows him barging in on his wife and her lover, hacking the former to death with an ax before cutting out her heart, which the wife had once said would always belong to him.
 S&G: A parking lot security camera catches two people attacking a couple, beating the man with a baseball bat, and abducting the woman.
 Broadway Rob: The distorted home movie of a pedophile named Broadway Rob who forces two gagged boys, Shawn and Ben clad in only their socks and underwear to dance with him. Shawn tackles Rob, fatally strangling and stabbing him. Shawn and Ben flee, leaving Rob's dead body behind.
 Execution: A muffled black-and-white camcorder video of a hooded and masked group (possibly a cult or a gang) executing a man via decapitation in front of a woman, whom they taunt with the severed head before shooting her.
 ATM: A man is mugged and killed at an ATM.
 Autopsy: Japanese autopsy footage of a woman who was shot in the mouth, with the bullet exiting the top of her skull. The coroner eventually kicks the cameraman out due to his unprofessional antics and inattentiveness.
 Bullied: A trio of drunks use a camcorder to record themselves taking a man out into the woods under the pretense of initiating him into their group. The three bully and humiliate the man and, during a scuffle, one of them accidentally knocks him onto the knife another was holding. The trio panic and bicker, and the camera is dropped when a fight breaks out over whether they should go for help.
 Homecoming: A building security camera records two figures garroting a man.
 Ransom: A deteriorated series of ransom videos depict three men brutalizing a senator's daughter, who eventually dies due to the severity of her injuries.

After the last clip, Balan delivers the closing statement, "You realize now it's everywhere. Death casts a shadow on all our faces. The new media shines light on dank crevasses, revealing moral decay and broken experiences that are better left beyond the pale. Goosebumps explode on my skin with every clip we watch. I feel it now more than ever. How do you feel?"

Cast 
 Opening Credits:
 Mary Shore as The Victim
 Bludgeoning:
 Daniel V. Klein as Father
 Damien A. Maruscak as Son
 The Heist:
 Sonny L. Shannon as The Manager
 Matthew Plutko as The Cook
 Shelby Lyn Vogel as The Tender
 Sean L. Joyce as The Sprinter
 Rebecca Tronzo as Topaz
 Eric Schwartzbauer as Leon
 Aziza as Madam Green
 Don Moore as G.A. Moore
 Aymee Peake as April
 Chris Krzysik as The Barback
 Mike Driscoll as The Gent
 Michael Pacinda as PKC
 Anthony Matthews as PKC
 Fred Vogel as PKC
 Jerami Cruise as PKC
 The Cheat:
 Jason Schneeberger as Greg
 Lexi Jade as The Adulteress
 Scott Burke as The Adulterer
 S&G:
 Shelby Lyn Vogel as Lyn
 Jason Kollat as Michael
 Jim Kollat as Jim
 Anthony Matthews as Anthony
 Broadway Rob:
 Tom Smith as Broadway Rob
 Steve Schofield as Shawn
 Tim Schofield as Ben
 Execution:
 Jerami Cruise as The Executioner
 John Viss as Chuck
 John Ross as The Handler
 Aymee Peake as Jill
 Will Guffey as Smith
 Fred Vogel as Black
 ATM:
 Don Moore as The Banker
 Douglass Bell as Ace
 Autopsy:
 Dorian K. Arnold as The Doctor
 Bullied:
 Adrian Alexander D'Amico as Cope
 Dave Dalessandro as Jake
 Michael Witherel as Castle
 Jay Mattingly as Gromer
 Homecoming:
 Stephen Vogel as Eddie the Rat
 Kai Peter as Zack
 Jason Spence as Hudson
 Ransom:
 Harvey Daniels as Jovan
 Claude Marrow as Sidel
 Clint Brown as Deron
 Lacey Fleming as Ginnifer Mitchell

Reception 
Ryan Doom of Arrow in the Head gave Murder Collection V.1 a 2/4 and wrote, "In the end, I think it's an interesting exercise, but I don't know if it makes it a good movie. This isn't the type of film that I suspect most viewers would revisit often, if at all. Instead, it's just an experiment that people will dig or not, depending on how much violence and gore they can stomach without a story for context. While it captivated me at times with certain segments, others seemed unnecessary or overdone. But maybe that's just me". Horror News's Jay Alan praised the special effects, also calling the acting "convincingly believable for the most part" and writing, "As much as the film focuses on the graphic and dark nature of death, it also delves into the human psyche and personalities of the characters within the little given time shown."

References

External links 
 
 

2009 direct-to-video films
2009 horror films
2000s crime films
2000s English-language films
2000s heist films
2009 independent films
2009 films
Abandoned buildings and structures in fiction
American crime films
American direct-to-video films
American exploitation films
American films about revenge
American heist films
American horror anthology films
American independent films
American splatter films
Adultery in films
Direct-to-video horror films
Films set in 1992
Films set in 2006
Fiction about murder
Filicide in fiction
Films about bullying
Films about child abuse
Films about death
Films about kidnapping
Films about pedophilia
Films about security and surveillance
Films directed by Fred Vogel
Films set in forests
Films set in restaurants
Films shot in Pennsylvania
Found footage films
2000s Japanese-language films
Medical-themed films
2000s Russian-language films
Films about snuff films
2000s American films